Darkside (often stylized as DARKSIDE) is an American band based in New York City. The band was formed in Providence, Rhode Island in 2011 by electronic musician Nicolás Jaar and multi-instrumentalist Dave Harrington, both of whom were students at Brown University at the time. Their debut studio album, Psychic, was released in 2013 and was followed up by Spiral, released in 2021 after a hiatus.

History

2011–2013: Origins and debut album 
Jaar and Harrington first met while they were both students at Brown University. Harrington was recommended to Jaar by frequent collaborator Will Epstein when Jaar was looking for a third musician for his live band, with the three subsequently touring together to support Jaar's 2011 album Space Is Only Noise. On an off day during the tour, Jaar and Harrington began recording together in their Berlin hotel room for several hours until a cheap converter caused their speakers to blow, filling their room with smoke; the song would later become A1. 

Upon returning to the United States they continued to write and record together, developing their sound in Providence and New York.

Darkside EP 
Their first release as Darkside, the three-song Darkside EP, was released on November 17, 2011 via Clown & Sunset. It was critically well received, receiving positive reviews from several publications, including The Fader and Resident Advisor, as well as an 8.0 from Pitchfork. Jaar has described the project as blues-oriented and more guitar influenced than his previous work, stating in an interview with i-D magazine that Darkside is "the closest thing to rock & roll I've ever done." Stereogum has described the duo's sound as "dubbed-out jazzbo junkyard fuzz."

The duo debuted their live show in December 2011 to a sold out crowd at Music Hall of Williamsburg, stretching their three-song EP into an hour-long set. They also played at the 2012 SXSW festival. Pitchfork has credited the project with allowing Jaar to transition forward into a "proggier and more narcotic-sounding" space while still maintaining his unique aesthetic, in part due to Harrington's influence. The Fader also noted Harrington's contributions, stating that he "adds weight" to Jaar's signature "airy" sound. Darkside released their first music video in May 2012 for "A1", which was directed by Ryan Staake of Pomp&Clout and Clown & Sunset Aesthetics.

Random Access Memories Memories 
The duo released their second collaboration Random Access Memories Memories on June 20, 2013. The project, which was uploaded to a SoundCloud account under the pseudonym DaftSide, is a remix of Daft Punk's 2013 album Random Access Memories in its entirety. The remix album received positive reviews from critics and was described as "a dark, nearly industrial romp through a disjointed abandoned disco" by Death and Taxes. Pitchfork stated that the release was "a far greater work than standard remix albums" and praised the duo for their ability to balance originality and playfulness: "At times they're looking for nuances in the original, small threads they can pick up and take somewhere else. Elsewhere they're just having fun, acting on instincts, never over-awed by the material." Sasha Frere-Jones listed the project as one of the "Best Albums of 2013" in his annual writeup in The New Yorker.

Psychic 
Darkside's debut album Psychic was released on October 4, 2013. The album was recorded over the course of two years between Jaar's home in New York City, Harrington's family barn in Upstate New York, and a space in Paris where they would stay between tours. The band announced the album's completion on August 20, 2013, with Jaar and Harrington inviting fans via Facebook and Twitter to listen to the album with them at a small venue on New York's Lower East Side. The band had to do two listening sessions to accommodate all of the people who showed up.

"Golden Arrow", the album's first song, was made available as a free download on August 23, 2013 via the band's website and Jaar's label Other People.  The band originally billed the song as "the first 11 minutes of the DARKSIDE album" in posts, however, its title was revealed in a subsequent Pitchfork review, where the song was also named Best New Track. Spin also gave the track a positive review, describing the song as "11 minutes of instrumental excellence."

The album was met with glowing reviews, including a 9.0 rating and Best New Music designation from Pitchfork.

2014–present: Hiatus and Spiral 
On 17 August 2014, the group announced they were "coming to an end, for now" and would play their last show on September 12 at the Brooklyn Masonic Temple. The hiatus announcement was accompanied by the release of two new songs, "What They Say" and "Gone Too Soon," which were released together as a digital single and subsequently included on the Other People compilation Work.

In late 2020, the band unexpectedly released a live album on Bandcamp, PSYCHIC LIVE JULY 17 2014, which documents one of their final pre-hiatus performances from Belgium's Dour Festival. Just under two months later, the band announced new album Spiral.

Spiral 
On December 21, 2020, Darkside released "Liberty Bell", the first single from their second studio album Spiral. The album was preceded by two more singles before being released on July 23, 2021, receiving generally favorable reviews.

Discography

Albums

Extended plays

Live albums

Singles

Remixes
 Daft Punk – "Random Access Memories Memories" (2013) (Remixed album as Daftside)
 St. Vincent – "Digital Witness" (2014)

References

External links
 

American musical duos
Electronic music duos
Electronic music groups from New York (state)
Matador Records artists
Modular Recordings artists
Musical groups established in 2011
Musical groups from New York City
Downtempo musicians
2011 establishments in New York City